James Buller (17 June 1717 – 30 April 1765) of Morval in Cornwall and of Downes and King's Nympton in Devon, was a Member of Parliament for East Looe in Cornwall (1741-47) and for the County of Cornwall (1748-1765). He was ancestor of the Viscounts Dilhorne and the Barons Churston and built the Palladian mansion Kings Nympton Park in Devon.

Origins
He was the eldest son of John Francis Buller (1695-1751), MP for Saltash 1718-1722, of Morval, Cornwall by his wife Rebecca Trelawney (d.1743), daughter and co-heiress of Sir Jonathan Trelawny, 3rd Baronet, Bishop of Winchester. His younger brothers were the politicians John Buller (1721–1786), MP and Lord of the Admiralty, Francis Buller (1723-1764), MP,  and William Buller (1735-1796), Bishop of Exeter.

Education
He was educated at Balliol College, Oxford.

Career
Buller was elected MP for East Looe in Cornwall in 1741 and represented that constituency until 1747 In 1748 he was elected MP for Cornwall, sitting until his death in 1765.

Marriages and children
Buller married twice:
Firstly on 19 November 1739, to Elizabeth Gould (d.1742), daughter and co-heir of William Gould of Downes near Crediton, Devon, (which thenceforth became the principal Buller seat) and had by her a son:
James Buller (1740-1772), the father of James Buller (1766–1827), MP. 
Secondly in 1744 to Lady Jane Bathurst (d.1794), second (or third) daughter of Allen Bathurst, 1st Earl Bathurst. Between 1746–9 he built for her Kings Nympton Park in Devon. By his second wife, he had three sons and three daughters including: 
John Buller (1745-1793) (eldest son), of Morval, MP for Exeter 1768-74, Launceston 1774-80, West Looe 1780-2, a Lord of the Treasury. He inherited the estate of Morval from his father. John married Anne, the sister of Sir William Lemon in 1770 at Mylor, Cornwall. He was appointed Commissioner of Excise for Great Britain in 1790.
Sir Francis Buller, 1st Baronet (3rd son) was a judge and was created a baronet in 1790 and was the ancestor of Baron Churston.
Mary Buller, 3rd daughter, wife of James II Templer (1748-1813) of Stover House, Teigngrace, Devon.

Death
Buller died in 1765.

Sources
Burke's Landed Gentry, 1937, pp. 277–279, Buller of Downes.
History of Parliament biography

References

1717 births
1765 deaths
Alumni of Balliol College, Oxford
British MPs 1741–1747
British MPs 1747–1754
British MPs 1754–1761
British MPs 1761–1768
Members of the Parliament of Great Britain for Cornwall
Members of the Parliament of Great Britain for East Looe
People from Crediton
Tory MPs (pre-1834)
James, 1717